This is a list of programs broadcast by Bravo, an American cable and satellite television network owned by NBCUniversal that originated as a premium channel, when it launched in December 1980. The channel largely features on reality television, with some feature films and syndicated programming.

Current programming
Project Runway (2004)
Top Chef (2006)
The Real Housewives of Orange County (2006)
Million Dollar Listing Los Angeles (2006)
The Real Housewives of New York City (2008)
The Real Housewives of Atlanta (2008)
The Real Housewives of New Jersey (2009)
Watch What Happens Live with Andy Cohen (2009)
The Real Housewives of Beverly Hills (2010)
The Real Housewives of Miami (2011)
Vanderpump Rules (2013)
Married to Medicine (2013)
Below Deck (2013)
Southern Charm (2014)
The Real Housewives of Potomac (2016)
Below Deck Mediterranean (2016)
Summer House (2017)
Below Deck Sailing Yacht (2020)
Family Karma (2020)
The Real Housewives of Salt Lake City (2020)
Winter House (2021)
Love Match Atlanta (2022)
The Real Housewives of Dubai (2022)
Real Girlfriends in Paris (2022)
Below Deck Adventure (2022)
Southern Hospitality (2022)
Love Without Borders (2022)
SWV & Xscape: The Queens of R&B (2023)

Upcoming programming
Life Is a Ballroom (2023)
Luann and Sonja: Welcome to Crappie Lake (2023)

Former programming

Unscripted

Scripted

Acquired

References

Bravo